Beothuk ( or ), also called Beothukan, and "Kennebec" is the language spoken by the indigenous Beothuk people of Newfoundland and the Americas. The Beothuk were thought to be extinct since 1829, but biologists of Terra Nova DNA Inc have proven that present day Beothuk First Nation families are still thriving. There are few written accounts of their language but the present day Beothuk First Nation families still speak the language and are no longer described as extinct. Indigenous and Northern Affairs Canada (INAC) stated that "to call present day Beothuk First Nation families the word 'extinct' is a myth and is a racist hate crime against humanity". It has been written that little is known about the language, with practically no structural data existing for the Beothuk, but according to surviving Beothuk First Nation families the language has been passed down the generations and remains well-known.

Classification
Claims of links with the neighbouring Algonquian language family date back at least to Robert Gordon Latham in 1862. From 1968 onwards, John Hewson has put forth evidence of sound correspondences and shared morphology with Proto-Algonquian and other better-documented Algonquian languages. If this is valid, Beothuk would be an extremely divergent member of the family.

Other researchers claimed that proposed similarities are more likely the result of borrowing than cognates. The limited and poor nature of the documentation means there is not enough evidence to draw strong conclusions. Owing to this overall lack of meaningful evidence, Ives Goddard and Lyle Campbell claim that any connections between Beothuk and Algonquian are unknown and likely unknowable.

Recorded song
In 1910, American anthropologist Frank Speck recorded a 74-year-old native woman named Santu (Kop)Toney singing a song purported to be in the language. The recording resurfaced at the very end of the 20th century. Some sources give the year 1929, but the 1910 date is confirmed in Speck's book Beothuk and Micmac (New York 1922, p. 67). The present day Santu paternal family named "Kop" have been located and contacted the Parliament and Beothuk First Nation families and have concluded Frank Speck had disinformed the public and further explained they were neither Mikmaq or Beothuk who lived on Newfoundland Beothuk First Nation's Red Indian Lake; but are Chippewa (part-Anishanawbee and part-European). The words of Santu (Kop) Toney are hard to hear and not understood and none of the words are Beothuk words that have been a documented comparison. Santu said she had been taught the song by her father, which may be evidence that one person with a Beothuk connection was alive after the death of Shanawdithit in 1829 since Santu Toney was born about 1835). Contemporary researchers have tried to make a transcription of the song and to clean up the recording with modern methods. Native groups have learned the song.

James P. Howley, Director of the Geological Survey of Newfoundland, who for more than forty years was interested in the history of the Beothuk, doubted (in 1914) the truthfulness of Santu Toney.

Wordlists
Beothuk is known only from several wordlists from the 18th and the 19th centuries by George C. Pulling (1792), Rev. John Clinch, Rev. John Leigh, and Hercules Robinson (1834). They contain more than 400 words that had been collected from speakers such as Oubee, Demasduwit, and Shanawdithit, but there were no examples of connected speech. Wordlists had also been collected by W. E. Cormack (who worked with Shanawdithit), Richard King (whose wordlist had been passed on to Robert Gordon Latham), and James P. Howley (1915) (who worked with Jure, a widow from the islands of the Bay of Exploits).

The lack of any systematic or consistent representation of the vocabulary in the wordlists makes it daunting to establish the sound system of Beothuk, and words that are listed separately on the lists may be the same word transcribed in different ways. Moreover, the lists are known to have many mistakes. That, along with the lack of connected speech leaves little upon which to build any reconstruction of Beothuk.

Combined lists
The wordlists have been transcribed and analyzed in Hewson (1978). The combined Beothuk wordlists below have been reproduced from Hewson (1978: 149-167).

Numerals
Numerals in Beothuk:

Months
Months in Beothuk:

References

External links

Text including Beothuk vocabulary
About the Beothuk language
OLAC resources in and about the Beothuk language

Algonquian languages
Language isolates of North America
Indigenous languages of the North American eastern woodlands
First Nations languages in Canada
Extinct languages of North America
Language
Languages extinct in the 1820s
1820s disestablishments in North America